Mark Boyle (born 19 December 1981) is a Scottish former professional snooker player. He first joined the professional tour for the 2006–07 season, but dropped off at the end of the season. He returned in 2009–10 but dropped off again at the end of the season after a 10–8 defeat by Jimmy White. Boyle is currently a professional pool player. 
Boyle is the ambassador for the Mick McGoldrick junior pool academies with many of his students going on to represent Scotland.

He was runner-up at the 2006 IBSF World Grand Prix

Tournament wins

Billiards
 2003 Scottish Billiards Champion
 2004 Scottish Billiards Champion

Snooker
 2005 Home International Champions (Team Scotland)
 2008 Scottish Champion
 2009 Scottish Champion

Pool
 2018 IPA Premier League Champion
 2018 IPA British Open Champion
 2018 English Open Champion
 2018 Scottish IM2 Champion
 2018 Scottish Super 11's Champions With Falkirk.
 2018 IPA Scottish Professional Champion
 2018 IPA World Doubles Champions, with Liam Dunster.
 2017 IPA Welsh Open Champion
 2017 IPA English Open Champion
 2017 IPA English Amateur Champion
 2017 EBA UK Champion
 2017 Scottish IM2 Champion
 2017 Scottish IM4 Champion
 2017 Scottish Super 15's Champions with Falkirk.
 2016 Scottish IM4 Champion
 2014 Scottish IM1 Champion
 2014 Scottish IM2 Champion
 2013 Scottish Champion
 2013 Scottish IM1 Champion
 2013 Scottish IM2 Champion
 2013 Scottish IM4 Champion
 2012 Scottish IM2 Champion
 2011 Scottish IM3 Champion
 2011 Scottish IM6 Champion

International Team Events. (for Team Scotland)
2018 European Championship Winners
2015 Nation Cup Winners
2012 European Championship Winners

References

External links
 Player profile on World Snooker
 Player profile on Global Snooker

1981 births
Living people
Scottish snooker players
Sportspeople from Stirling